WENV-LP (97.3 FM, "WENV 97.3 The Warrior") is a radio station licensed to Gainesboro, Tennessee, United States. The station is currently owned by Save the Cumberland, Inc.

Coverage Area
WENV-LP is licensed to Gainesboro, Tennessee, but does not serve that community with either its City or Service grade signals.  WENV-LP serves a stretch of the Cumberland River with little to no population.

References

External links
 
 

ENV-LP